Michael Nevin is a British diplomat, who served as  British Ambassador to Iceland from 2016 to 2021.

Prior to this, he was the British High Commissioner in Malawi from 2012 until August 2016. He said of British aid to Malawi that the UK wants "to move from dependence to a particular kind of relationship where both countries will be able to depend on each other in different areas such as trade".

Nevin joined the Foreign and Commonwealth Office in 1993. He has served in Nairobi, Lilongwe, Osaka, New York and Riyadh in various roles at the FCO. He is married to Sawako Newin and has three children.

In August 2021 he transferred to a different appointment within the Diplomatic Service and was succeeded as ambassador to Iceland by Bryony Mathew.

References 

Year of birth missing (living people)
Living people
Ambassadors of the United Kingdom to Iceland
20th-century British diplomats
21st-century British diplomats